The 2010–11 season will be Győri ETO FC's 67th competitive season, 51st consecutive season in the Soproni Liga, and 106th year in existence as a football club.

Team kit and logo
The team kits for the 2010-11 season are produced by Puma and the shirt sponsor is Quaestor. The home kit is green and white colours and the away kit is white and black colours.

Transfers

Summer

In:

Out:

List of Hungarian football transfer summer 2010

Club

Coaching staff

Top scorers
Includes all competitive matches. The list is sorted by shirt number when total goals are equal.

Last updated on 26 April 2011

Disciplinary record
Includes all competitive matches. Players with 1 card or more included only.

Last updated on 26 April 2011

Overall
{|class="wikitable"
|-
|Games played || 35 (25 Soproni Liga, 8 UEFA Europa League, 2 Hungarian Cup and 0 Hungarian League Cup)
|-
|Games won || 13  (8 Soproni Liga, 4 UEFA Europa League, 1 Hungarian Cup and 0 Hungarian League Cup)
|-
|Games drawn ||  11  (8 Soproni Liga, 2 UEFA Europa League, 1 Hungarian Cup and 0 Hungarian League Cup)
|-
|Games lost ||  11  (8 Soproni Liga, 3 UEFA Europa League, 0 Hungarian Cup and 0 Hungarian League Cup)
|-
|Goals scored || 48
|-
|Goals conceded || 37
|-
|Goal difference || +11
|-
|Yellow cards || 93
|-
|Red cards || 6
|-
|rowspan="1"|Worst discipline ||  Dániel Völgyi (11 , 0 )
|-
|rowspan="1"|Best result || 5–1 (A) v Barcsi SC - Magyar Kupa - 26-10-2010
|-
|rowspan="2"|Worst result || 0–3 (A) v Ferencvárosi TC - Nemzeti Bajnokság I - 01-09-2010
|-
| 0–3 (A) v Kaposvári Rákóczi FC - Nemzeti Bajnokság I - 19-11-2010
|-
|rowspan="1"|Most appearances ||  Tamás Koltai (33 appearances)
|-
|rowspan="1"|Top scorer || Rati Aleksidze (9 goals)
|-
|Points || 50/105 (47.62%)
|-

Nemzeti Bajnokság I

Classification

Results summary

Results by round

Matches

Újpest FC: Balajcza – Szokol, Vermes, Takács, Pollák (Kiss 78.) – Simek, Egerszegi (Tajthy 58.), Tisza, Mitrovic, Simon – Sitku (Böőr 81.). Coach: Géza Mészöly.
Győri ETO FC: Stevanovic – Babic, Djordjevic, Stanisic, Szabó – Tokody (Ceolin 70.), Dinjar (Trajkovic 72.), Pilibaitis, Koltai (Cetkovic 61.) – Aleksidze, Nicorec. Coach: Attila Pintér.
G.: —
Y.: Tajthy (85.) – Stanisic (63.), Nicorec (72.), Trajkovic (80.)

Győri ETO FC: Stevanovic – Fehér, Djordjevic, Stanisic, Völgyi – Tokody, Pilibaitis, Dinjar (Cetkovic 61.), Koltai (Sharashenidze 46.) – Nicorec (Aleksidze 56.), Bouguerra. Coach: Attila Pintér.
BFC Siófok: Molnár – Graszl, Mogyorósi, Novák, Márton – Kecskés (Délczeg 77.), Ludánszki (Kocsis 69.), Ribeiro, Turosi, Piller – Sowunmi (Csermelyi 82.). Coach: István Mihalecz.
G.: Aleksidze (68.)
Y.: Sharashenidze (55.), Stevanovic (76.), Tokody (89.)
R:: Mogyorósi (67.), Piller (76.)

Vasas SC: Végh – Balog, Arnaut, Gáspár, Katona – Benounes (Arsic 75.), Bakos, Pavicevic, Kovács, Lázok (Hrepka 65.) – Ferenczi. Coach: Giovanni Dellacasa.
Győri ETO FC: Stevanovic – Babic, Djordjevic, Stanisic, Szabó – Tokody, Fehér, Dinjar (Copa 55.), Koltai (Bouguerra 46.) – Nicorec (Trajkovic 46.), Aleksidze. Coach: Attila Pintér.
G.: Ferenczi (4. - pen.), Benounes (62.) – Tokody (88.)
Y.: Lázok (12.), Bakos (47.), Hrepka (78.) – Djordjevic (3.), Szabó (37.), Stanisic (49.)

Győri ETO FC: Stevanovic – Babic, Stanisic, Eugene, Völgyi – Cetkovic (Ceolin 37.), Pilibaitis (Tokody 69.), Ganugrava, Trajkovic – Bouguerra, Sharashenidze (Ji-Paraná 71.). Coach: Attila Pintér.
MTK Budapest FC: Szatmári – Vukadinovic, Sütő, Pintér, Vadnai – Kanta, Pátkai (Ladányi 52.), Szekeres, Szabó (Könyves 62.), A. Pál – Tischler (Nikházi 86.). Coach: József Garami.
G.: Trajkovic (48.) – Kanta (28.)
Y.: Ganugrava (56.) – Kanta (24.), Ladányi (76.), Sütő (91.)

Ferencvárosi TC: Ranilovic – Balog, Csizmadia, Junior (Pölöskey 86.) – Rósa, Maróti, Józsi, Tóth (Jakimovski 81.) – Schembri, Heinz, Andrezinho (Adriano 68.). Coach: László Prukner.
Győri ETO FC: Stevanovic – Völgyi, Fehér, Babic, Szabó – Ji-Paraná (Kiss 70.), Tokody, Ganugrava, Trajkovic (Aleksidze 55.), Eugene (Koltai 25.) – Bouguerra. Coach: Attila Pintér.
G.: Heinz (1., 17.), Schembri (47.)
Y.: Rósa (67.) – Eugene (9.), Völgyi (25.), Stevanovic (67.), Ji-Paraná (67.), Fehér (78.)

Győri ETO FC: Stevanovic – Babic, Fehér, Szabó, Völgyi – Tokody, Ji-Paraná (Dinjar 57.), Pilibaitis, Koltai (Cetkovic 80.) – Ceolin (Trajkovic 70.), Aleksidze. Coach: Attila Pintér.
Debreceni VSC: Malinauskas – Nagy (Farkas 37.), Komlósi, Mijadinoski, Laczkó – Czvitkovics, Kiss, Varga, Szakály (Dombi 67.) – Coulibaly (Rezes 75.), Yannick. Coach: András Herczeg.
G.: Koltai (7., 67.), Aleksidze (87.)
Y.: Ji-Paraná (38.), Aleksidze (43.) – Nagy (34.), Komlósi (43.), Varga (84.)
R:: Farkas (42.)

Szolnoki MÁV FC: Tarczy – Schindler, Stanisic, Pető, Hevesi-Tóth – Remili, Molnár, Koós, Búrány (Marozas 74.), Tchami (Lengyel 46.) – Alex (Ngalle 56.). Coach: Attila Vágó.
Győri ETO FC: Stevanovic – Babic, Djordjevic, Fehér, Völgyi (Szabó O. 60.) – Ceolin (Dinjar 78.), Tokody, Pilibaitis, Koltai – Nicorec (Trajkovic 13.), Aleksidze. Coach: Attila Pintér.
G.: Koltai (37.), Ceolin (51., 73.)
Y.: Pető (33.), Molnár (61.), Hevesi-Tóth (69.) – Tokody (28.), Trajkovic (45.), Dinjar (79.), Pilibaitis (80.)
R.: Molnár (89.) – Pilibaitis (87.)

Győri ETO FC: Stevanovic – Fehér, Djordjevic, Szabó – Kiss, Tokody, Ganugrava, Trajkovic (Dinjar 69.), Völgyi (Cetkovic 57.) – Koltai (Sharashenidze 54.), Aleksidze. Coach: Attila Pintér.
Zalaegerszegi TE: Vlaszák – Kocsárdi, Miljatovic (Bogunovic 67.), Varga, Panikvar – Horváth, Kamber, Máté, Illés (Delic 74.) – Pavicevic (Simon 62.), Rajcomar. Coach: János Csank.
G.: Bogunovic (82.)
Y.: Kiss (28.), Aleksidze (42.), Fehér (84.) – Kocsárdi (25.), Pavicevic (43.), Illés (48.)

Szombathelyi Haladás: Rózsa – Schimmer, Guzmics, Lengyel, Tóth – Irhás (Lattenstein 86.), Molnár, Sipos – Nagy, Kenesei, Oross (Obric 55.). Coach: Aurél Csertői.
Győri ETO FC: Stevanovic – Tokody, Djordjevic, Fehér, Szabó – Ganugrava (Ji-Paraná 57.), Pilibaitis, Kiss (Trajkovic 31.), Koltai – Bouguerra (Copa 80.), Aleksidze. Coach: Attila Pintér.
G.: Sipos (13.), Lengyel (49.), Schimmer (70.) – Pilibaitis (5.), Trajkovic (41.), Aleksidze (47.)
Y.: Lengyel (21.), Kenesei (76.), Sipos (89.) – Pilibaitis (54.), Aleksidze (64.), Djordjevic (71.)

Győri ETO FC: Stevanovic – Tokody (Fehér 29.), Djordjevic, Stanisic, Szabó – Koltai, Trajkovic (Ganugrava 62.), Pilibaitis, Völgyi (Ceolin 61.) – Bouguerra, Aleksidze. Coach: Attila Pintér.
Lombard-Pápa TFC: Szűcs – Takács, Supic, Farkas, Németh – Rebryk (Quintero 87.), Gyömbér, Bárányos. Zulevs (Abwo 57.) – Maric, Heffler (Tóth 92.). Coach: György Véber.
G.: Abwo (81.)
Y.: Trajkovic (8.), Djordjevic (64.) – Maric (38.), Farkas (44.)
R:: Djordjevic (79.)

Paksi SE: Csernyánszki – Heffler, Éger, Fiola (Lisztes 93.), Csehi – Magasföldi (Báló 65.), Böde, Sifter, Vayer – Bartha, Montvai (Kiss 62.). Coach: Károly Kis.
Győri ETO FC: Sánta – Fehér, Stanisic, Eugene, Völgyi – Dinjar (Aleksidze 51.), Copa (Szabó 68.), Pilibaitis, Trajkovic – Bouguerra, Koltai (Ceolin 46.). Coach: Attila Pintér.
G.: Vayer (75.), Böde (79.) – Bouguerra (62.)
Y.: Völgyi (35.), Szabó (74.), Stanisic (77.), Pilibaitis (77.), Eugene (91.)

Győri ETO FC: Radosavljević – Fehér, Stanisic, Dordevic, Szabó (Völgyi 15.) – Tokody (Ganugrava 90.), Pilibaitis, Trajkovic, Koltai (Sharashenidze 62.) – Ceolin, Bouguerra. Coach: Attila Pintér.
Kecskeméti TE - Ereco: Rybánsky – Alempijevic, Némedi, Balogh, Mohl – Bori (Csordás 80.), Cukic (Dosso 80.), Foxi, Savic (Ebala 64.), Litsingi – Tököli. Coach: Tomislav Sivic.
G.: Pilibaitis (18. - pen.), Bouguerra (38.) – Némedi (45.+2 - pen.)
Y.: Fehér (16.), Dordevic (58.), Völgyi (72.) – Ebala (76.), Litsingi (82.)

Budapest Honvéd FC: Kemenes – Takács, Debreceni, Botis, Hajdú – Abass, Horváth (Akassou 72.), Moreira, Danilo – Bojtor (Sadjo 79.), Rouani (Rufino 75.). Coach: Massimo Morales.
Győri ETO FC: Radosavljević – Fehér, Stanisic, Eugene, Völgyi – Copa, Kiss (Ji-Paraná 46.), Pilibaitis, Koltai (Aleksidze 65.) – Ceolin (Marinelli 59.), Bouguerra. Coach: Attila Pintér.
G.: Hajdú (48. - pen.) – Völgyi (67.)
Y.: Copa (20.), Bouguerra (34.)

Győri ETO FC: Stevanovic – Fehér, Stanisic, Djordjevic, Völgyi – Dinjar (Koltai 46.), Copa (Eugene 56.), Pilibaitis, Trajkovic, Tokody (Ganugrava 47.) – Bouguerra. Coach: Attila Pintér.
Videoton FC Fehérvár: Bozovic – Lázár, Lipták, Vaskó, Andic – Sándor (Gosztonyi 60.), Vasiljevic (Szakály 79.), Farkas, Elek, Polonkai (Nikolic 46.) – Alves. Coach: György Mezey.
G.: Ganugrava (85.) – Alves (92. - pen.)
Y.: Djordjevic (1.), Trajkovic (36.) – Lipták (45.), Vaskó (52.), Elek (62.), Andic (82.)
R:: Stanisic (53.), Fehér (91.) – Vaskó (84.)

Kaposvári Rákóczi FC: Milinte – Grúz, Zsók, Zahorecz – Gujic, Hegedűs, Balázs, Pedro, Jawad (Pavlovic 86.) – Szepessy (Kulcsár 56.), Oláh (Peric 77.). Coach: Tibor Sisa.
Győri ETO FC: Stevanovic – Copa, Djordjevic, Eugene, Völgyi – Trajkovic (Sharashenidze 60.), Ganugrava (Ji-Paraná 30.), Pilibaitis (Briones 68.), Koltai – Ceolin, Bouguerra. Coach: Attila Pintér.
G.: Oláh (13., 57.), Pedro (59.)
Y.: Pedro (38.) – Ganugrava (12.), Copa (13.), Völgyi (63.), Pilibaitis (67.)

Győri ETO FC: Stevanovic – Copa, Eugene, Totadze, Völgyi – Dinjar (Ceolin 70.), Ganugrava, Pilibaitis, Trajkovic (Koltai 65.) – Aleksidze (Marinelli 78.), Bouguerra. Coach: Attila Pintér.
Újpest FC: Balajcza – Pollák, Szokol (Kiss 46.), Takács, Vermes – Kovács (Sitku 37.), Mitrovic, Simon (Simek 79.), Tajthy – Rajczi, Tisza. Coach: Géza Mészöly.
G.: Bouguerra (42.), Ceolin (87.) – Simon (60.)
Y.: Völgyi (55.) – Rajczi (57.), Tajthy (71.), Vermes (92.)

BFC Siófok: Molnár – Mogyorósi, Graszl, Novák – Katona, Tusori, Kecskés (Csermelyi 81.), Lukács (Melczer 75.) – Csordás, Nomel (Homma 59.), Délczeg. Coach: István Mihalecz.
Győri ETO FC: Stevanovic – Takács, Djordjevic, Stanisic – Kiss (Ji-Paraná 46.), Koltai (Copa 82.), Pilibaitis, Trajkovic, Dinjar – Aleksidze, Bouguerra (Sharashenidze 69.). Coach: Attila Pintér.
G.: Aleksidze (20.)
Y.: Graszl (91.) – Aleksidze (73.)

Győri ETO FC: Stevanovic – Takács, Djordjevic, Stanisic, Völgyi – Koltai (Niksic 53.), Pilibaitis (Kiss 57.), Ji-Paraná, Trajkovic – Aleksidze, Bouguerra (Copa 65.). Coach: Attila Pintér.
Vasas SC: G. Németh – Balog (Szilágyi 47.), Gáspár, Mileusnic, Présinger – Kulcsár, Lisztes (Ponczók 65.), Kovács, Rezes – Ferenczi, Lázok (Beliczky 85.). Coach: András Komjáti.
G.: Gáspár (35.)
Y.: Bouguerra (21.), Copa (71.), Stanisic (78.), Kiss (81.) – Rezes (78.), Kovács (86.)

MTK Budapest FC: Szatmári – Vukadinovic, Sütő, Szekeres, Vadnai (Vukmir 65.) – Könyves, Pátkai (Urbán 46.), Kanta, Gál, Ladányi – Eppel (Tischler 84.). Coach: József Garami.
Győri ETO FC: Stevanovic – Takács, Stanisic, Djordjevic, Völgyi – Dinjar (Niksic 86.), Kiss, Ji-Paraná, Pilibaitis, Koltai (Bouguerra 86.) – Aleksidze (Copa 86.). Coach: Aurél Csertői.
G.: —
Y.: Könyves (38.), Kanta (76.), Urbán (84.), Tischler (87.) – Völgyi (10.), Stanisic (12.)

Győri ETO FC: Stevanovic – Takács, Djordjevic, Fehér, Völgyi – Dinjar (Dudás 70.), Kiss, Pilibaitis, Ji-Paraná – Aleksidze (Trajkovic 76.), Koltai (Bouguerra 76.). Coach: Aurél Csertői.
Ferencvárosi TC: Ranilovic – Csizmadia, Tutoric, Dragóner, Rodenbücher – Rósa, Maróti (Stanic 52.), Andrezinho (Tóth 55.) – Schembri, Heinz, Morales (Abdi 68.). Coach: László Prukner.
G.: Aleksidze (50.)
Y.: Völgyi (42.), Koltai (48.), Pilibaitis (93.) – Maróti (34.)

Debreceni VSC: Verpecz – Bernáth, Komlósi, Mijadinoski, Mardare – Czvitkovics, Varga, Bódi, Szakály – Coulibaly, Illés (Kabát 68.). Coach: Zdenek Scasny.
Győri ETO FC: Stevanovic – Takács, Fehér, Dordevic, Völgyi – Dinjar (Dudás 86.), Kiss, Pilibaitis, Ji-Paraná, Koltai (Ceolin 74.) – Aleksidze (Bouguerra 79.). Coach: Aurél Csertői.
G.: Czvitkovics (50. - pen.) – Dinjar (60.)
Y.: Bernáth (75.), Mardare (80.), Kabát (87.) – Pilibaitis (49.), Ceolin (84.), Dudás (91.)

Győri ETO FC: Stevanovic – Takács, Djordjevic, Stanisic, Völgyi – Kiss, Fehér, Ji-Paraná (Ganugrava 68.), Dinjar – Koltai (Bouguerra 70.), Aleksidze (Dudás 88.). Coach: Aurél Csertői.
Szolnoki MÁV FC: Melnichenko – Szalai, Milicic (Zsolnai 61.), Máté, Djurovic – Fitos (Lengyel 46.), Búrány, Némedi, Vukomanovic – Ngalle, Remili (Antal 75.). Coach: Antal Simon.
G.: Dinjar (31.), Ji-Paraná (54.), Djordjevic (91.), Dudás (92.) – Némedi (50.), Djurovic (88.)
Y.: Fehér (23.), Völgyi (91.), Dudás (92.) – Remili (45.), Milicic (54.), Ngalle (70.), Máté (87.)
R:: Ngalle (83.)

Zalaegerszegi TE: Sipos – Kocsárdi, Miljatovic, Bogunovic, Panikvar – Simonfalvi (I. Delic 46.), Horváth (Rajcomar 77.), Kamber, Balázs – Simon (A. Delic 66.), Turkovs. Coach: János Csank.
Győri ETO FC: Stevanovic – Fehér, Eugene, Stanisic, Völgyi – Kiss, Ganugrava (Bouguerra 66.), Pilibaitis, Dinjar – Koltai (Dudás 57.), Aleksidze (Totadze 72.). Coach: Aurél Csertői.
G.: Ganugrava (47. - o.g.) – Völgyi (79.)
Y.: Balázs (39.) – Eugene (36.), Völgyi (63.), Totadze (74.), Ganugrava (79.)
R.: Eugene (71.)

Győri ETO FC: Stevanovic (Radosavljević 63.) – Babic, Djordjevic (Stanisic 77.), Fehér, Völgyi – Kiss, Pilibaitis, Dinjar, Koltai – Aleksidze (Bouguerra 81.), Dudás. Coach: Aurél Csertői.
Szombathelyi Haladás: Rózsa – Schimmer (Nagy II 15.), Guzmics, Korolovszky, P. Tóth – Sipos (Sluka 63.), Molnár, Á. Simon, Halmosi – Kenesei, Fodrek (Irhás 63.). Coach: Zoltán Aczél.
G.: Aleksidze (55., 58.) – Kenesei (81.), P. Tóth (91.)
Y.: Völgyi (40.) – P. Tóth (11.), Rózsa (93.)

Lombard-Pápa TFC: Szűcs – Nagy, Dlusztus, Supic, Németh – Zulevs, Gyömbér, Bárányos – Heffler (Bali 46.), Maric, Rebryk (Quintero 80.). Coach: György Véber.
Győri ETO FC: Stevanovic – Babic, Stanisic, Fehér, Totadze – Dinjar, Kiss, Pilibaitis (Trajkovic 75.), Koltai (Ji-Paraná 66.) – Dudás (Ceolin 46.), Aleksidze. Coach: Aurél Cserőti.
G.: Bárányos (65.), Maric (94.) – Totadze (88.)
Y.: Zulevs (30.), Rebryk (42.), Quintero (83.), Bárányos (89.) – Dinjar (15.), Babic (24.), Stanisic (47.), Pilibaitis (68.), Totadze (74.), Aleksidze (94.)

Magyar Kupa

Fourth round

Barcsi SC: Halasi – Dienes (Bernando 66.), Balogh, Horváth, Pókos – Hock (Miskovics 51.), Kordé (Tompa 54.), Koller, Gergulás – Pavicevic, Scepanovic. Coach: Dragan Puskas.
Győri ETO FC: Sánta – Fehér, Stanisic, Eugene (Dordevic 57.), Szabó – Ceolin, Ganugrava, Pilibaitis (Briones 52.), Koltai – Trajkovic (Marinelli 22.), Bouguerra. Coach: Attila Pintér.
G.: Koller (90.) – Pilibaitis (22. - pen.), Bouguerra (30., 50.), Koltai (39., 84.), Ceolin (49., 54.)
Y.: Koller (33.), Dienes (61.) – Ganugrava (28.)

Fifth round

First leg

MTK Budapest FC: Szatmári – Vukadinovic, Szekeres, Sütő, Vadnai – Kanta, Vukmir, Ladányi – Könyves, Tischler (Eppel 74.), Szabó (Csiki 62.). Coach: József Garami.
Győri ETO FC: Stevanovic – Fehér, Eugene, Stanisic, Völgyi – Ceolin (Bouguerra 46.), Ji-Paraná (Trajkovic 66.), Pilibaitis, Ganugrava – Copa, Aleksidze (Marinelli 70.). Coach: Attila Pintér.
G.: —
Y.: Kanta (15.), Vukadinovic (19.) – Aleksidze (37.), Eugene (78.), Ganugrava (80.)

UEFA Europa League

Qualifying round

First qualifying round

First leg

FC Nitra: Hrosso – Tóth, Lesko, Glenda, Kasprak – Stetina, Kolmokov, Hodur, Balis (Sloboda 70.) – Simonek (Mikus 46.), Valenta (Kolar 56.). Coach: Ivan Galád.
Győri ETO FC: Sánta – Djordjevic, Fehér, Szabó (Völgyi 74.), Stanisic – Pilibaitis (Copa 32.), Kink, Koltai (Cetkovic 62.), Tokody – Aleksidze, Nicorec. Coach: Attila Pintér.
G.: Tóth (13.), Sloboda (80.) – Kink (39., 58.)
Y.: Nicorec (87.)

Second leg

Győri ETO FC: Sánta – Djordjevic, Fehér, Szabó, Kiss (Babic 46.) – Pilibaitis, Kink, Koltai (Ceolin 57.), Tokody – Aleksidze (Copa 75.), Nicorec. Coach: Attila Pintér.
FC Nitra: Hrosso – Tóth, Lesko, Glenda, Kasprak – Stetina, Hodur, Balis (Kolar 46.), Simoncic – Sloboda (Valenta 61.), Mikus (Rák 51.). Coach: Ivan Galád.
G.: Aleksidze (22.), Nicorec (60.), Kink (92.) – Hodur (10.)
Y.: Nicorec (28.), Kink (41.), Tokody (53.) – Sloboda (50.), Lesko (58.), Kasprák (89.)

Győri ETO FC won 5–3 on aggregate.

Second qualifying round

First leg

FC Atyrau: Shabanov – Crnogorac, Aliyev, Zhumabayev, Vorotnikov – Mamonov, Peikrishvili (Chureev 84.), Kostrub, Shakin – Sakhalbayev (Larin 76.), Frunza (Khizhnichenko 59.). Coach: Victor Pasulko.
Győri ETO FC: Stevanovic – Djordjevic, Fehér, Babic, Szabó – Stanisic, Pilibaitis, Kink (Bouguerra 65.), Koltai (Trajkovic 46.) – Copa, Aleksidze (Ceolin 46.). Coach: Attila Pintér.
G.: Pilibaitis (26.), Bouguerra (88.)
Y.: Aliyev (20.), Frunza (44.), Zhumabayev (86.) – Babic (19.), Fehér (77.), Bouguerra (79.)

Second leg

Győri ETO FC: Stevanovic – Djordjevic, Babic, Szabó, Stanisic – Pilibaitis, Kink, Dnijar (Copa 59.), Koltai (Sharashenidze 67.) – Aleksidze (Bouguerra 77.), Nicorec. Coach: Attila Pintér.
FC Atyrau: Shabanov – Aliyev, Chureyev, Zhumabayev, Vorotnikov – Croitoru, Peikrishvili (Larin 70.), Kostrub, Shakin (Khizhnichenko 62.) – Sakhalbayev (Mamonov 75.), Frunza. Coach: Victor Pasulko.
G.: Aleksidze (47.), Nicorec (52.)
Y.: Shalabayev (45.)

Győri ETO FC won 5–0 on aggregate.

Note 1: UEFA awarded Győri ETO a 3–0 win due to Atyrau fielding a suspended player in the first leg. The original match had ended in a 2–0 win for Győri ETO.

Third qualifying round

First leg

Győri ETO FC: Stevanovic – Babic, Djordjevic, Stanisic, Szabó – Dinjar, Koltai (Sharashenidze 66.), Nicorec (Copa 52.), Pilibaitis, Ceolin – Aleksidze (Bouguerra 58.). Coach: Attila Pintér.
Montpellier HSC: Jourdren – El-Kaoutari, Spahic, Yangambiwa, Jeunechamp – Pitau, Estrada (Saihi 90.), Belhanda (Marveaux 71.) – Kabze (Ait-Fana 64.), Giroud, Camara. Coach: René Girard.
G.: Giroud (32.)
Y.: Copa (82.) – Jeunechamp (24.), Estrada (90.)

Second leg

Montpellier HSC: Jourdren – Collin (Armand 94.), Spahic, Yangambiwa, Stambouli – Estrada, Saihi, Marveaux (Camara 63.) – Ait-Fana, Giroud, Kabze (Belhanda 63.). Coach: René Girard.
Győri ETO FC: Stevanovic – Babic, Djordjevic, Stanisic, Szabó – Pilibaitis, Ceolin (Copa 66.), Nicorec (Fehér 46.), Tokody, Koltai (Cetkovic 78.) – Aleksidze. Coach: Attila Pintér.
G.: Babic (40.)
Y.: Collin (75.), Spahic (114.), Giroud (117.), Saihi (118.) – Stanisic (6.), Babic (89.), Aleksidze (90.+3)
R.: Stanisic (45.)

Montpellier 1–1 Győri ETO on aggregate. Győri ETO won 4–3 on penalties.

Play-off round

First leg

Győri ETO FC: Stevanovic – Tokody, Djordjevic, Fehér, Szabó – Koltai, Pilibaitis (Trajkovic 78.), Dinjar (Ji-Paraná 34.), Copa (Bouguerra 53.), Ceolin – Aleksidze. Coach: Attila Pintér.
NK Dinamo Zagreb: Loncaric – Vrsaljko, Biscan, Cufré, Ibánez – Callelo, Badelj, Etto (Ademi 87.), Sammir, Morales (Mesaric 56.) – Rukavina (Sivonjic 76.). Coach: Vahid Halilhodzic.
G.: Rukavina (19., 28.)
Y.: Pilibaitis (21.), Djordjevic (52.), Trajkovic (87.), Szabó (91.) – Sivonjic (77.)

Second leg

NK Dinamo Zagreb: Loncaric – Biscan, Cufré, Mesaric (Etto 33.), Vrsaljko – Ademi, Badelj, Morales (Dodo 66.), Sammir – Kramaric (Chago 79.), Rukavina. Coach: Vahid Halihodzic.
Győri ETO FC: Stevanovic – Babic, Djordjevic, Fehér, Stanisic (Szabó 33.) – Koltai (Dinjar 56.), Pilibaitis, Tokody, Ceolin, Völgyi – Aleksidze (Bouguerra 66.). Coach: Attila Pintér.
G.: Sammir (45.+2 - pen., 84. - pen.) – Ceolin (17.)
Y.: Mesaric (20.), Rukavina (73.) – Szabó (45.), Fehér (64.), Stevanovic (82.), Babic (87.), Völgyi (88.)

NK Dinamo Zagreb won 4–1 on aggregate.

References

External links
 Eufo
 ETO
 UEFA
 fixtures and results

2010-11
Hungarian football clubs 2010–11 season